The Beitou Park is a park in Beitou District, Taipei, Taiwan.

History
The park was created in 1913, making it the third oldest park in Taipei and the first hot spring park on the island. It was constructed to welcome the visit of Prince Hirohito to Taiwan. The construction included the overhaul works of the area around it into the park. Soon later, a water fountain was constructed at the center of the park. Years later, the downspouts were removed from the park but was then restored in 2013 by the Taipei City Government.

Geography
The park spans over an area of six hectares [14.8 acres] and is located along the Beitou River. The park features the Beitou Hot Spring Museum and Taipei Public Library Beitou Branch. It also has five small waterfalls with hot springs.

Transportation
The park is accessible within walking distance east of Xinbeitou Station of Taipei Metro.

See also
 List of parks in Taiwan

References

1913 establishments in Taiwan
Parks established in 1913
Parks in Taipei